Silakheri railway station is an Indian railway station on the Indore–Gwalior line under the Ratlam railway division of Western Railway zone. This is situated beside National Highway 3 at Chhota Mahalasapura in Dewas district of the Indian state of Madhya Pradesh.

References

Railway stations in Dewas district
Ratlam railway division